Fernando Vera (born 4 February 1954) is a Chilean former cyclist. He competed at the 1976 Summer Olympics and the 1984 Summer Olympics.

Vera tested positive for a prohibited substance at the 1983 Pan American Games and was disqualified.

References

External links
 

1954 births
Living people
Chilean male cyclists
Olympic cyclists of Chile
Cyclists at the 1976 Summer Olympics
Cyclists at the 1984 Summer Olympics
Sportspeople from Santiago
Doping cases in cycling
Chilean sportspeople in doping cases
Pan American Games medalists in cycling
Pan American Games gold medalists for Chile
Pan American Games silver medalists for Chile
Pan American Games bronze medalists for Chile
Cyclists at the 1975 Pan American Games
Cyclists at the 1979 Pan American Games
Medalists at the 1975 Pan American Games
Medalists at the 1979 Pan American Games
20th-century Chilean people
21st-century Chilean people